Patterson, Virginia may refer to the following places in Virginia:
Patterson, Buchanan County, Virginia
Patterson, Wythe County, Virginia